Ollávarre (in Basque Olabarri and officially Ollávarre/Olabarri) is a village in Álava, Basque Country, Spain. It had 213 inhabitants in 2015 and it is located between the villages of Montevite and Nanclares de la Oca, within the municipality of Iruña de Oca.

Until 1976, next to Nanclares de la Oca and Montevite, it was within a municipality called Nanclares de la Oca. 

Populated places in Álava
Towns in Spain